The Cathedral Parkway–110th Street station is a local station on the IND Eighth Avenue Line of the New York City Subway. It is located in the Upper West Side and Morningside Heights, Manhattan, at West 110th Street and Frederick Douglass Boulevard at the northwest corner of Central Park. The station is served by the B on weekdays, the C train at all times except nights, and the A train during late nights only.

History
The station opened on September 10, 1932, as part of the city-operated Independent Subway System (IND)'s initial segment, the Eighth Avenue Line between Chambers Street and 207th Street. Construction of the whole line cost $191.2 million (equivalent to $ million in ). While the IRT Broadway–Seventh Avenue Line already provided parallel service, the new Eighth Avenue subway via Central Park West and Frederick Douglass Boulevard provided an alternative route.

Under the 2015–2019 Metropolitan Transportation Authority (MTA) Capital Plan, the station underwent a complete overhaul as part of the Enhanced Station Initiative and was entirely closed for several months. Updates included cellular service, Wi-Fi, USB charging stations, interactive service advisories and maps. A request for proposals for the 72nd Street, 86th Street, Cathedral Parkway–110th Street, and 163rd Street–Amsterdam Avenue stations was issued on June 1, 2017, and the New York City Transit and Bus Committee officially recommended that the MTA Board award the $111 million contract to ECCO III Enterprises in October 2017. As part of the renovations, the station was closed from April 9, 2018 to September 2, 2018. The southbound platform opened first, on September 2, followed by the northbound platform on September 4.

Station layout

This underground station has four tracks and two side platforms.

The two center express tracks are used by the A train during daytime hours and the D train at all times.

The platforms have no trim line, but there are mosaic name tablets reading "110TH STREET CATHEDRAL P'KWAY." in white sans-serif lettering broken into two lines on a midnight blue background and black border. Grey (previously blue) I-beam columns run at regular intervals with alternating ones having the standard black station name plate in white lettering. Toward the southern end of the station, the northbound express track descends below the other three tracks of the Eighth Avenue Line.

At the south end of the station, two staircases from each platform go up to a mezzanine above the tracks that allows a free transfer between directions. There was a crossunder at the 110th Street exits, but it was closed in 1992.

The artwork at the station, installed in 1999, is called Migrations by Christopher Wynter in memory of Athie L. Wynter. It has three different areas of mosaic panels, two on each platform and one on the full-time mezzanine. As part of the 2018 renovation, this artwork was expanded.

Exits
This station's full-time entrance/exit is at the south end, serving 109th Street. From the mezzanine above the tracks at the south end of the station, a turnstile bank provides entrance/exit from the system. Outside of fare control, there is a token booth and two staircases to the street. The southbound platform has an additional same-level entrance/exit at the north end, serving 110th Street. It has a part-time bank of four turnstiles and is unstaffed.

 One stair, NW corner of Frederick Douglass Circle at 110th Street and Central Park West (southbound only; part-time)
 One stair, SW corner of Central Park West and West 109th Street (both platforms; full-time)
 One stair, east side of Central Park West at West 109th Street, within Central Park (both platforms; full-time)

The northbound platform formerly had an entrance/exit to the northeast corner of Frederick Douglass Circle; this entrance corresponded to the open exit to the northwest corner of Fredrick Douglass Circle on the southbound platform and is indicated by directional "110" signs without arrows below mosaics of the station name. Both platforms also had an entrance/exit at the north end to both northern corners of 111th Street and Frederick Douglass Boulevard; the northbound platform's entrance/exit led to the northeastern corner and the southbound platform's entrance/exit leading to the northwestern corner. All these exits have been sealed up with white tiling and used as employee-only spaces. The mezzanine had a second exit to the northwestern corner of 109th Street and Central Park West.

Nearby points of interest
Columbia University
Morningside Park
Cathedral of St. John the Divine

References

External links 

 
 nycsubway.org – Migrations Artwork by Christopher Wynter (1999)
 Station Reporter – B Train
 Station Reporter – C Train
 The Subway Nut – 110th Street–Cathedral Parkway Pictures 
 MTA's Arts For Transit – Cathedral Parkway–110th Street (IND Eighth Avenue Line)
 Frederick Douglass Circle entrance from Google Maps Street View
 109th Street entrance from Google Maps Street View
 109th Street entrance in Central Park from Google Maps Street View
 Platform from Google Maps Street View

IND Eighth Avenue Line stations
Eighth Avenue (Manhattan)
Cathedral Parkway–110th Street station
Railway stations in the United States opened in 1932
Upper West Side
Central Park
Morningside Heights, Manhattan
1932 establishments in New York City